A Special Envoy of the Secretary-General (SESG) is a senior United Nations official appointed by the United Nations Secretary-General to deal with a set of specific issues.

Examples include the SESGs on Children affected by Armed Conflict, on HIV/AIDS in Africa, on LRA-affected areas, on indigenous people, to a specific country etc. George H. W. Bush, the 41st president of the United States, was chosen by the UN to serve as the Special Envoy to South Asia in December 2005. Others include Bill Clinton, a former president of the United States, was named the Special Envoy to Haiti in 2009, and, in July 2012, Gordon Brown, a former Prime Minister of the United Kingdom, was named the special envoy on Global Education. For much of 2012 Kofi Annan, the seventh Secretary-General of the United Nations, was Joint Special Envoy for the United Nations and the Arab League for Syria. There are many other people of different backgrounds who serve the Secretary-General.

Current Special Envoys 
Special Envoys of the Secretary-General (SESGs) active  include:
 Hans Grundberg (SWE), appointed Special Envoy of the Secretary-General for Yemen on 6 August 2021
 Noeleen Heyzer (SGP), appointed Special Envoy of the Secretary-General on Myanmar on 25 October 2021
 Geir Otto Pedersen (NOR), appointed Special Envoy of the Secretary-General for Syria on 31 October 2018
 Maria-Francesca Spatolisano (ITA), appointed Acting Special Envoy of the Secretary-General on Technology in March 2019
 Hanna Tetteh (GHA), appointed Special Envoy of the Secretary-General for the Horn of Africa on 22 February 2022
 Xia Huang (CHN), appointed Special Envoy of the Secretary-General for the Great Lakes Region of Africa in April 2019

Personal Envoys 
Personal Envoys of the Secretary-General active  include:
 Staffan de Mistura (ITA), appointed Personal Envoy of the Secretary-General for Western Sahara on 6 October 2021. De Mistura is tasked with "provid[ing] good offices on behalf of the Secretary-General… [and] work[ing] with all relevant interlocutors, including the parties, neighbouring countries and other stakeholders, guided by Security Council resolution 2548 (2020) and other relevant resolutions."
 Mirko Manzoni (CHE), appointed Personal Envoy of the Secretary-General for Mozambique on 8 July 2019. Manzoni is tasked with "provid[ing] good offices support in facilitating the dialogue between the Government of Mozambique and RENAMO and towards the signing and subsequent implementation of a peace agreement between the parties."

Former Special Envoys 

The UN has appointed a number of Special Envoys.

 Kofi Annan served as Joint Special Envoy for the United Nations and the Arab League for Syria during 23 February to 31 August 2012 
 Michael Bloomberg was appointed Special Envoy for Climate Action on 5 March 2018. Bloomberg was previously appointed Special Envoy of the Secretary-General for Cities and Climate Change on 31 January 2014
 Gordon Brown was appointed Special Envoy for Global Education in 2012
 George H. W. Bush was appointed the Special Envoy for South Asia on 30 December 2005
 Maria Soledad Cisternas Reyes was appointed the Special Envoy on Disability and Accessibility on 20 June 2017
 Bill Clinton was appointed the Special Envoy for Haiti in May 2009
 Virendra Dayal was appointed the Special Envoy of the Secretary-General for facilitating the Negotiations to end apartheid in South Africa in 1992
 Staffan de Mistura (ITA) was appointed the Special Envoy of the Secretary-General for Syria on 10 July 2014.
 Said Djinnit was appointed the Special Envoy of the Secretary-General to the Great Lakes Region on 17 July 2014
 Martin Griffiths served as Special Envoy of the Secretary-General for Yemen during 16 February 2018 to 19 July 2021
 Hiroute Guebre Sellassie was appointed the Special Envoy of the Secretary-General for the Sahel on 30 April 2014
 Han Seung-soo was appointed the Special Envoy of the Secretary-General for Disaster Risk Reduction and Water on 19 December 2013
 Macharia Kamau and Mary Robinson were appointed as Special Envoys of the Secretary-General for El Niño and Climate on 20 May 2016
 George C. Marshall was appointed the Special Envoy for negotiating the Communist Party of China and the Nationalists (Kuomintang) into a unified government in 1945
 Haile Menkerios (ERI) was appointed the Special Envoy of the Secretary-General for Sudan and South Sudan on 29 July 2011
 Mahmoud Mohieldin was appointed as the Special Envoy on Financing the 2030 Agenda on 4 February 2020
 Ismail Ould Cheikh Ahmed was appointed the Special Envoy of the Secretary-General for Yemen on April 25, 2015.
 Terje Rød-Larsen was appointed the Special Envoy of the Secretary-General for the Implementation of United Nations Security Council Resolution 1559 on 3 January 2005
Christine Schraner Burgener served as Special Envoy of the Secretary-General on Myanmar during 28 April 2018 through October 2021

See also
 Special Representative of the Secretary-General
 Goodwill ambassador

References

United Nations posts
United Nations Secretariat